Vasili George Spanos (born February 25, 1981) is an American former professional baseball third baseman who played internationally for the Greece national baseball team at the 2004 Olympics, and professionally in the Oakland Athletics and Florida Marlins minor league systems from 2003 to 2008.

Biography
A native of Melrose Park, Illinois, Spanos attended Indiana University Bloomington. In 2002, he played collegiate summer baseball for the Falmouth Commodores of the Cape Cod Baseball League, and was named a league all-star. Spanos was selected by Oakland in the 11th round of the 2003 MLB Draft.

References

External links

1981 births
American people of Greek descent
People from Melrose Park, Illinois
Baseball players at the 2004 Summer Olympics
Olympic baseball players of Greece
Greek baseball players
Living people
Falmouth Commodores players
Stockton Ports players
Kane County Cougars players
Jupiter Hammerheads players
Midland RockHounds players
Lancaster Barnstormers players
Baseball players from Illinois